Glasgow Pollok may mean or refer to:

 Glasgow Pollok (UK Parliament constituency)
 Glasgow Pollok (Scottish Parliament constituency)